Mark Field (born 21 March 1984) is an English former rugby league footballer who played in the 2000s.

Outside of rugby league 
Mark attended Royds High School in Leeds.

References 

1984 births
Living people
Dewsbury Rams players
English rugby league players
People from Rothwell, West Yorkshire
Rugby league centres
Rugby league fullbacks
Rugby league wingers
Rugby league players from Yorkshire
Wakefield Trinity players